The 1985 Tour de Romandie was the 39th edition of the Tour de Romandie cycle race and was held from 7 May to 12 May 1985. The race started in Monthey and finished in Geneva. The race was won by Jörg Muller of the Skil team.

General classification

References

1985
Tour de Romandie
1985 Super Prestige Pernod International